Hotel Abadía Retuerta LeDomaine, the former Monastery of Santa María de Retuerta, is located on the left bank of the river Duero, near the town of Sardón de Duero, in the province of Valladolid, autonomous community of Castile and León, Spain. The monastery belonged to the Premonstratensians and was built during the period of 1146 through the 15th century in late-Romanesque style. It was founded by Sancho Ansúrez, grandson of Count Pedro Ansúrez. The building was declared a Monumento Histórico-Artístico of national interest on June 3, 1931, and then a Bien de Interés Cultural. More recently, it has been transformed into a hotel, and belongs to the privately owned business group Novartis. In 2016, it was awarded as the best tourist hotel by Fitur.

References

Bibliography
 ANDRÉS GONZÁLEZ, PATRICIA Monasterio de Santa María de Retuerta. Guía breve. Edita: Edilesa, 2005. .
 ANDRÉS GONZÁLEZ, PATRICIA Monasterios premostratenses en Castilla y León. Las grandes órdenes monacales en Castilla y León. Editorial Edilesa, 2002.
 Herrera Marcos, Jesús, Arquitectura y simbolismo del románico en Valladolid. Edita Ars Magna, 1997. Diputación de Valladolid.

External links

Official website

Christian monasteries in Spain
Former churches in Spain
Monasteries in Castile and León
Premonstratensian monasteries in Spain
Romanesque architecture in Castile and León
Bien de Interés Cultural landmarks in the Province of Valladolid
Hotels in Spain
12th-century architecture